Senegalia mellifera is a common thorn tree in Africa.   The name mellifera refers to its sweet-smelling blossoms and honey.  Its lumber turns pitch black when oiled. Common names of the tree include Blackthorn and Swarthaak (Afrikaans). It is listed as being not threatened.

Distribution 
Senegalia mellifera is found in the dry areas of Africa and the Arabian Peninsula.

Characteristics 
Senegalia mellifera can occur either as a multi-trunked bush up to seven metres high with more or less a funnel-shaped crown, or as a single-trunked tree that can reach a height of up to nine metres. It can form an impenetrable thickets. In some areas of Africa, it is considered an invasive species as it can expand into and cover large areas of farmland.

Uses 

In Africa, Senegalia mellifera is used as fencing, livestock feed and building material for huts. It flowers are sources of nectar for honey-producing bees. The wood is prized also for fuel and making charcoal. It is widely used in traditional African medicine. The plant contains the psychoactive chemical DMT.

Animal uses 
This tree is an important feed resource for both cattle and wild animals especially in dry areas of Africa. The leaves and young branches are very nutritious, containing a high percentage of protein. The flowers are often eaten by kudu. Common browsers of the tree include elephants, black rhino, giraffe and the eland. Acacia mellifera leaves can constitute an important part of goat diets.

References

General references 
 Wikipedia (German) "Schwarzdorn-Akazie"
 Acacia mellifera: A Guide to trees (Safari Holiday Guide)

Notes

External links
 

mellifera
Plants used in traditional African medicine
Trees of Africa
Flora of the Arabian Peninsula
Forages